Golemas is a village situated in the central plains of Albania's Western Lowlands region. It is part of Tirana County. As a result of the 2015 local government reform it became part of the municipality Kavajë.

References

Populated places in Kavajë
Villages in Tirana County